Cylindromyrmex is a Neotropical genus of ants in the subfamily Dorylinae.

Distribution and habitat 
The genus is known from the New World, from Central America to Brazil, Bolivia and the Galápagos Islands, and currently contains 10 extant species and 3 fossil species. The fossil species, all described from single or a small number of specimens, were found in Dominican amber. Their nesting place include cavities of wood and even termite nests. Like their nesting habits, their feeding habits are not fully know, but they are said to be predators of termites.

Species

†Cylindromyrmex antillanus De Andrade, 1998
Cylindromyrmex boliviae Wheeler, 1924
Cylindromyrmex brasiliensis Emery, 1901
Cylindromyrmex brevitarsus Santschi, 1925
Cylindromyrmex darlingtoni Wheeler, 1937
†Cylindromyrmex electrinus De Andrade, 1998
Cylindromyrmex escobari De Andrade, 1998
Cylindromyrmex godmani Forel, 1899
†Cylindromyrmex inopinatus De Andrade, 2001
Cylindromyrmex longiceps André, 1892
Cylindromyrmex meinerti Forel, 1905
Cylindromyrmex striatus Mayr, 1870
Cylindromyrmex whymperi (Cameron, 1891)

References

External links

Dorylinae
Ant genera
Hymenoptera of South America
Hymenoptera of North America